Elisolimax rufescens is a species of air-breathing land snail or semislug, terrestrial pulmonate gastropod mollusks in the family Helicarionidae.

This species is endemic to Tanzania.

References

rufescens
Endemic fauna of Tanzania
Invertebrates of Tanzania
Taxonomy articles created by Polbot